Paul George (born 27 January 1994) is a professional footballer from Northern Ireland. George has previously played for Scottish sides Celtic, Hamilton, and Dunfermline Athletic. He has also represented both Northern Ireland and Republic of Ireland at youth levels.

Career
George joined the Celtic youth squad in 2008 and made his senior debut on 21 September 2011 when he came on as a late substitute in a 2–0 League Cup victory over Ross County. He suffered a broken leg on 7 April 2012, following a challenge by a Rangers player in a U19 Old Firm match. Celtic initially announced that he could be out for between six and eight months following the injury. Despite the injury, George's performances over the course of the season saw him win the Under 19 League Player of the Season award.

After recovering from this injury, George joined Scottish Championship club Hamilton Academical on loan in January 2014 and made 17 appearances in total. He returned to Celtic at the end of the season but an injury in pre-season training saw George miss a substantial part of the start of the 2014–15 season. He made a handful of appearances for the Development Side before being released by Celtic in January 2015.

In February 2015, George appeared as a trialist for Dunfermline Athletic in a Fife Cup match against Cowdenbeath. After impressing manager John Potter with his performance, the Pars signed George until the end of the season. George was released at the end of the season, after making only 8 appearances for the side.

After having trials at Derry City and Glentoran, George signed for Cliftonville in October 2015. In June 2016, George signed for Australian side Ballarat Red Devils playing in the National Premier Leagues Victoria 2 West.

International career
Killough born George started his international career with Northern Ireland, earning three under-17 caps. In 2011, he switched allegiance to the Republic of Ireland earning under-17 and under-19 caps.

Career statistics

Honours
Celtic
Scottish Premier League Under 19 Player of the Year (1): 2011–12

Cliftonville
Northern Ireland Football League Cup Winner (1): 2015–16

References

External links

1994 births
Living people
Sportspeople from County Down
Celtic F.C. players
Hamilton Academical F.C. players
Dunfermline Athletic F.C. players
Cliftonville F.C. players
Ballarat City FC players
National Premier Leagues players
Expatriate soccer players in Australia
Association footballers from Northern Ireland
Northern Ireland youth international footballers
Republic of Ireland association footballers
Republic of Ireland youth international footballers
Association football wingers
Scottish Professional Football League players